Gillian Pollock is a paralympic swimmer from New Zealand competing mainly in category S8 events.

Gillian was part of the New Zealand team that made the short trip to Sydney for the 2000 Summer Paralympics.  There she won a silver medal in the 200m medley behind Hungary's Dora Pastztory who set a new games record. Gillian also swam in the 100m backstroke finishing fifth, 400m freestyle finishing sixth but failed to make the final in either the 100m breaststroke or butterfly.

References

External links 
 
 

Paralympic swimmers of New Zealand
Swimmers at the 2000 Summer Paralympics
Paralympic silver medalists for New Zealand
New Zealand female medley swimmers
Living people
Medalists at the 2000 Summer Paralympics
Year of birth missing (living people)
Paralympic medalists in swimming
S8-classified Paralympic swimmers